The 1979 Champ Car season may refer to:

 the 1979 USAC Championship Car season
 the 1979 SCCA/CART Indy Car Series, sanctioned by CART, who would later become Champ Car